Marta Olehivna Kostyuk (born 28 June 2002) is a Ukrainian tennis player. She has career-high rankings of world No. 40 in singles, achieved on 6 March 2023, and world No. 31 in doubles, achieved on 30 January 2023. She has won one singles WTA Tour title at the 2023 ATX Open and one doubles WTA title at the 2022 Slovenia Open.

Early and personal life
Marta is the daughter of Oleh Kostyuk and his wife, Talina Beiko. Her father was the technical director of the Antey Cup, a junior tennis tournament in Kyiv; her mother was a professional tennis player who reached a career-high WTA ranking of No. 391, and won a $10k title in her home city of Kyiv in 1994, and represented a Ukrainian tennis team. Her uncle Taras Beyko is also a retired tennis player. Marta is a sister of collegiate tennis player Mariya Kostyuk, who competed for Chicago State University and Southeast Missouri State University. Marta is a cousin of professional football players Vadym and Myroslav Slavov and gymnast Oksana Slavova.

Kostyuk started playing tennis at a young age at the Antey Tennis Club, on the west side of Kyiv, coached by her mother. She described her initial experience in tennis at age five: "My mom was always working a lot as a coach, and the first time I went to the courts to train, I just understood that if I started doing tennis, I'd get to spend more time with my mom. So that was kind of my motivation – if I played tennis, I'd be around her more often". She was also coached by her maternal uncle Taras Beiko, who had played for the USSR and Ukraine in the late 1980s and early 1990s.

Career

2015–2017
In December 2015, Marta won the "14-and-under" competition at the Orange Bowl in Florida. The following month, she won the 2016 Petits As in Tarbes, France, in both singles and doubles (with Kamilla Bartone).

In January 2017, Kostyuk won the Australian Open girls' singles championships. In May, she won an ITF tournament in Dunakeszi (Hungary) without dropping a set, becoming the youngest Ukrainian to win a professional singles title. In September, she won the girls' doubles title at the US Open, playing with Olga Danilović. In October, she won the year-end junior girls tournament, the ITF Junior Masters in Chengdu, China.

On 30 October 2017, Kostyuk achieved a career-high junior ranking of world No. 2.

2018–2019: Grand Slam debut and first two wins, First WTA quarterfinal 

Kostyuk made her main draw tour-level debut at the Australian Open. Having received a wildcard entry into the qualifying tournament, she defeated Arina Rodionova, Daniela Seguel and Barbora Krejčíková to become the first player born in 2002 to play in a Grand Slam main draw. By defeating Peng Shuai in the first round, Kostyuk became the youngest player to win a main-draw match in Melbourne since Martina Hingis in 1996. In the second round, she defeated Australian wildcard Olivia Rogowska in straight sets. In doing this, she became the youngest player to reach the third round of a Grand Slam event since Mirjana Lučić-Baroni reached the same stage at the 1997 US Open. However, she fell in round three to fourth seed and compatriot player Elina Svitolina.

Kostyuk won the Burnie International, a $60k tournament in Australia, in February 2018, and reached the final of the Zhuhai Open, also a $60k tournament, in March, but did not sustain her level of success in the rest of the year. 

In 2019, she won two further ITF titles, and reached the quarterfinals of the WTA tournament at Strasbourg as a qualifier where she lost to fourth seed Caroline Garcia.

She finished the season ranked No. 155.

2020: US Open third round, French Open quarterfinal in doubles
In February, Kostyuk won the $60k Cairo Open. She also won the Cairo doubles tournament, playing with Kamilla Rakhimova. Following the break in the season caused by the COVID-19 pandemic, she competed in the Palermo Ladies Open qualifying, reaching the second round, and came through the qualifying to enter the main draw of the Prague Open.

At the US Open, she beat former top-10 player Daria Kasatkina, in straight sets in the first round. She then beat former semifinalist and 31st seed Anastasija Sevastova. In the third round, she met former champion and world No. 9, Naomi Osaka. She overcame a first set deficit by winning the second in a tie-breaker, but was beaten in the third.

2021: First WTA 500 semifinal, French Open fourth round, top 50 debut
At the WTA 500 Abu Dhabi Open she reached the semifinals defeating Lucie Hradecká, Hsieh Su-wei, Tamara Zidansek and Sara Sorribes Tormo.

At the French Open, she defeated former French Open champion and 12th seed, Garbiñe Muguruza, in the first round, 6–1, 6–4. In the fourth round, her best Grand Slam showing, she was defeated by the defending champion, Iga Świątek.
Kostyuk reached the top 50 on 1 November 2021, her best career ranking.

2022: Second Australian Open third round
At the Australian Open, she reached the third round defeating 32nd seed Sara Sorribes Tormo before losing to world No. 6 and eight seed, Paula Badosa.

At the Eastbourne International, she defeated seventh seed Barbora Krejčíková to reach the third round.

She reached the semifinals at the Championnats de Granby where she lost to Daria Saville after withdrawing from the match.

2023: Major doubles semifinal, Maiden WTA Tour title & top 40
At the WTA 500 Adelaide International 1, she went through qualifying and on to the quarterfinals, beating reigning Wimbledon champion Elena Rybakina en route. She defeated 28th seed Amanda Anisimova and Olivia Gadecki to reach the third round at the Australian Open for the third time. In doubles at the same tournament, she reached the semifinals partnering Elena-Gabriela Ruse.
She reached her second quarterfinal in Hua Hin, Thailand.
At Dubai, after receiving a wildcard, she lost in the second round to eight seed Belinda Bencic in the second longest match of the season in 3 hours and 27 minutes.
She reached her third quarterfinal of the season at the inaugural 2023 ATX Open in Austin, Texas defeating Dalma Galfi and American Madison Brengle. Next, she defeated Anna-Lena Friedsam to reach the semifinals and forth seed American Danielle Collins to reach her first WTA final. She won her maiden WTA Tour title defeating another first time WTA finalist, Varvara Gracheva. She did not shake her Russian opponent's hand, and dedicated her win "to Ukraine and to all the people who are fighting and dying right now". This win lifted her into the top 40 in the singles rankings.

Performance timelines

Only main-draw results in WTA Tour, Grand Slam tournaments, Fed Cup/Billie Jean King Cup and Olympic Games are included in win–loss records.

Singles
Current after the 2023 Indian Wells.

Doubles

WTA career finals

Singles: 1 (1 title)

Doubles: 2 (1 title, 1 runner-up)

WTA Challenger finals

Doubles: 1 (title)

ITF finals

Singles: 8 (3 titles, 5 runner-ups)

Doubles: 2 (2 titles)

Junior Grand Slam finals

Singles: 1 (title)

Doubles: 1 (title)

ITF Junior Circuit finals

Singles: 9 (5 titles, 4 runner-ups)

Doubles: 6 (5 titles, 1 runner-up)

WTA Tour career earnings
Current as of 23 May 2022

Career Grand Slam tournament statistics

Seedings
The tournaments won by Kostyuk are in boldface, and advanced into finals by Kostyuk are in italics.

Best Grand Slam tournament results details

Record against top 10 players

Kostyuk's record against players who have been ranked in the top 10. Active players are in boldface:

Top 10 wins

Doubles

Double bagel matches

Notes

References

External links
 
 
 

2002 births
Living people
Sportspeople from Kyiv
Ukrainian female tennis players
Australian Open (tennis) junior champions
Grand Slam (tennis) champions in girls' singles
Grand Slam (tennis) champions in girls' doubles
21st-century Ukrainian women